Steven Rossitto is an Australian jazz singer. He was nominated for the 2012 ARIA Award for Best Jazz Album with his album Night & Day.

Discography

Albums

Extended plays

Awards and nominations

ARIA Music Awards
The ARIA Music Awards is an annual awards ceremony that recognises excellence, innovation, and achievement across all genres of Australian music. They commenced in 1987. 

! 
|-
| 2012
| Night & Day
| Best Jazz Album
| 
| 
|-

References

External links
Steven Rossitto

Australian jazz singers
Living people
21st-century Australian male singers
Year of birth missing (living people)